The McGraw-Hill Encyclopedia of Science & Technology is an English-language multivolume encyclopedia, specifically focused on scientific and technical subjects, and published by McGraw-Hill Education. The most recent edition in print is the eleventh edition, copyright 2012, comprising twenty volumes. The encyclopedia covers the life sciences and physical sciences, as well as engineering and technology topics. The content is also available via a subscription to McGraw-Hill Education's website.

There is also a one-volume McGraw-Hill Concise Encyclopedia of Science and Technology based on the full set. The sixth edition was published in May 2009 in twenty volumes including the "Index".

Further "Concise" editions for Chemistry or Engineering are available today.

The references work has been mentioned and reviewed too.

References 

Encyclopedias of science
McGraw-Hill books
21st-century encyclopedias